Salvador Arredondo Ibarra (born 12 July 1948) is a Mexican politician affiliated with the National Action Party. As of 2014 he served as Deputy of the LX Legislature of the Mexican Congress representing the State of Mexico.

References

1948 births
Living people
Politicians from the State of Mexico
National Action Party (Mexico) politicians
21st-century Mexican politicians
National Autonomous University of Mexico alumni
Academic staff of the National Autonomous University of Mexico
Academic staff of the Instituto Politécnico Nacional
Members of the Congress of the State of Mexico
Deputies of the LX Legislature of Mexico
Members of the Chamber of Deputies (Mexico) for the State of Mexico